A. nigricauda may refer to:

 Acanthurus nigricauda, the epaulette surgeonfish, a fish species
 Amphisbaena nigricauda, a worm lizard species  found in Brazil
 Anaxibia nigricauda, a spider species endemic to Sri Lanka

See also
 Nigricauda (disambiguation)